Crvivci is a village in the municipality of Kičevo, North Macedonia. It used to be part of the former municipality of Oslomej.

Demographics
As of the 2021 census, Crvivci had 705 residents with the following ethnic composition:
Albanians 671
Persons for whom data are taken from administrative sources 34

According to the 2002 census, the village had a total of 1,725 inhabitants. Ethnic groups in the village include:
Albanians 1,702
Macedonians 3
Bosniaks 1
Others 19

References

External links

Villages in Kičevo Municipality
Albanian communities in North Macedonia